Best Actor in a Supporting Role is a British Academy Film Award presented annually by the British Academy of Film and Television Arts (BAFTA) to recognize an actor who has delivered an outstanding supporting performance in a film. Actors of all nationalities are eligible to receive the award.

Winner and nominees

1960s

1970s

1980s

1990s

2000s

2010s

2020s

Note: No award for Best Supporting Actor or Best Supporting Actress was presented in 1980. In 1981, the award was for Best Supporting Artist. All four nominees were male.

Multiple nominations

7 nominations
 Denholm Elliott

4 nominations
 John Gielgud
 Philip Seymour Hoffman
 Ian Holm
 John Hurt
 Tommy Lee Jones
 Jack Nicholson

3 nominations
 Robert Duvall
 Edward Fox
 Alan Rickman
 Mark Ruffalo
 Geoffrey Rush
 Tom Wilkinson

2 nominations
 Alan Alda
 Alan Arkin
 Mahershala Ali
 Christian Bale
 Martin Balsam
 Ian Bannen
 Javier Bardem
 Jim Broadbent
 Simon Callow
 George Clooney
 Sean Connery
 Benicio del Toro
 Albert Finney
 Brendan Gleeson
 Hugh Grant
 Gene Hackman
 Ed Harris
 Anthony Hopkins
 Barry Keoghan
 Ray McAnally
 Alfred Molina
 Edward Norton
 Al Pacino
 Brad Pitt
 Christopher Plummer
 Ralph Richardson
 Sam Rockwell
 Jason Robards
 Paul Scofield
 Christopher Walken
 Christoph Waltz

Multiple wins
3 wins
 Denholm Elliott (consecutive)

2 wins
 Edward Fox
 Ian Holm
 Ray McAnally
 Geoffrey Rush
 Christoph Waltz

See also
 Academy Award for Best Supporting Actor
 Guldbagge Award for Best Actor in a Supporting Role
 Critics' Choice Movie Award for Best Supporting Actor
 Golden Globe Award for Best Supporting Actor – Motion Picture
 Screen Actors Guild Award for Outstanding Performance by a Male Actor in a Supporting Role

References

External links
 BAFTA Awards Database

British Academy Film Awards
 
Film awards for supporting actor